Friedland is a surname of German and Ashkenazi Jewish origin. Notable people with the surname include:

 Adam Friedland (born 1987) American stand-up comedian and podcaster
 Anatole Friedland (1888–1938), composer, songwriter, vaudeville performer, and Broadway producer
 Dalia Friedland (born 1935), Israeli actress and singer
 David Friedland (born 1937), American lawyer and politician
 Georges Friedland (1910–1993), French screenwriter, film director and editor
 Gerald Friedland (born 1978), professor
 Jonathan Friedland (born 1960), British physician and medical researcher
 Kevin Friedland (born 1981), American soccer player
 Larry Friedland (born 1930s), American property developer
 Martin Friedland (born 1932), Canadian lawyer, academic, and author
 Michelle Friedland (born 1972), United States judge
 Natan Friedland (died 1883), rabbi and member of the H'bat Tsion movement
 Robert Friedland (born 1950), American/Canadian financier
 Sherman Friedland (born 1933), professor
 Shmuel Friedland (born 1944), Israeli-American mathematician
 Valentin Friedland (1490–1556), German scholar and educationist of the Reformation
 William H. Friedland (1923–2018), American sociologist